Abdul Hayy Lucknawi Firangi Mahali (24 October 1848 - 27 December 1886) was an Indian Islamic scholar of Hanafi school of Islamic thought.

Lineage
Abdul Hayy was born in Banda, India. He was a descendant of Abu Ayyub al-Ansari.

Early life

After his father's death, he studied mathematics under his father's tutor, Muhammad Niamatullah.  He taught for a while in Hyderabad. Subsequently, he left for Lucknow where he remained for the rest of his life.

Scholarly accomplishments

He reportedly saw numerous companions of Muhammad in his dreams, including Abu Bakr, Umar, ibn Abbas, Fatimah, Aishah, and Umm Habiba. In his dreams he also claimed to have met Malik ibn Anas, al-Sakhawi, Jalaluddin Suyuti and other scholars, from whom he benefited as mentioned in one of his books.

Status as a Muhaddith
The Mufti of Makkah, Ahmad Ibn Zain Dahlan, granted him permission for all isnad (chains of narration) from Al Hidayah of Burhan al-Din al-Marghinani, Muhammad Ibn Abdullah Hanbali of Makkah and Muhammad Ibn Muhammad Al-Gharbi.  Abdul Ghani Dehlwi also granted him permission for various isnad.

Literary works
 Gheebat Kya Hai?
 Al-Ajwibah al-Fadilah lil As'ilat (Arabic)
 Al-Raf' Wal Takmil Fil Jarh Wal Ta'dil (Arabic)
 Iqamatul Hujjah 'Ala Annal Ikthar fil ta'abud (Arabic)
 at-Ta'liq al-Mumajjad (Arabic)
 Sharh Al-Wiqaya Ma'a Hashiyat 'Umdatul Ri'ayah (Arabic)
 Tuhfatu Al-Akhyar bi Ahya Sunnat Sayyid al-Abrar (Arabic)
 Sibahatil Fikr Fil Jahr Bil Zikr (Arabic)
 Rijal : Narrators of The Muwatta al-Imam Muhammad
 Dhikr: In the Vocal Form, Permissibility and Virtues of Dhikr

Death
He died in Rabi ul Awwal at the age of 38 and was buried in the graveyard of his ancestors.

References 

Hanafis
Maturidis
Hadith scholars
Indian Sunni Muslim scholars of Islam
People from Banda, Uttar Pradesh
1848 births
1886 deaths
Scholars from Lucknow
Deobandis